Neophyllaphidinae is a subfamily of the family Aphididae.

References

 

Hemiptera subfamilies